Gąsiory  is a village in the administrative district of Gmina Ulan-Majorat, within Radzyń Podlaski County, Lublin Voivodeship, in eastern Poland.

References

Villages in Radzyń Podlaski County